Sir Charles Harding Firth  (16 March 1857 – 19 February 1936) was a British historian. He was one of the founders of the Historical Association in 1906.  Esmond de Beer wrote that Firth "knew the men and women of the seventeenth century much as a  man knows his friends and acquaintances, not only as characters but also in the whole moral and intellectual world in which they lived."

Career
Born in Sheffield, Firth was educated at Clifton College and at Balliol College, Oxford. At university he received the Stanhope prize for an essay on Richard Wellesley, 1st Marquess Wellesley in 1877 and was a member of the exclusive Stubbs Society for high-achieving historians. He became lecturer at Pembroke College in 1887, and fellow of All Souls College in 1901. He was Ford's lecturer in English history in 1900, was elected FBA in 1903 and became Regius Professor of Modern History at Oxford in succession to Frederick York Powell in 1904. Firth's historical work was almost entirely confined to English history during the time of the English Civil War and the Commonwealth; and although he is somewhat overshadowed by S. R. Gardiner, who wrote about the same period, his books were highly regarded.

Teaching vs scholarship
Firth was a great friend and ally of T. F. Tout, who was professionalising the History undergraduate programme at Manchester University, especially by introducing a key element of individual study of original sources and production of a thesis. Firth's attempts to do likewise at Oxford brought him into bitter conflict with the college fellows, who had little research expertise of their own and saw no reason why their undergraduates should be made to acquire such arcane, even artisan, skills, given their likely careers. They saw Firth as a power-seeker for the university professoriate as against the role of the colleges as proven finishing-schools for the country and empire's future establishment. Firth failed but the twentieth century saw universities go his and Tout's way.

He was elected a member of the American Antiquarian Society in 1892.

He served as president of the Royal Historical Society from 1913 to 1917.

His letters to Tout are in the latter's collection in the John Rylands Library, Manchester University.

Major works
Life of the Duke of Newcastle (1886)
Scotland and the Commonwealth (1895)
Scotland and the Protectorate (1899)
Narrative of General Venables (1900)
Oliver Cromwell and the Rule of the Puritans in England (1900)
Cromwell's Army: A History of the English Soldier during the Civil Wars, the Commonwealth and the Protectorate (1902) (publication of Firth's Ford Lectures given at Oxford, 1900–1901)
The standard edition of Ludlow's Memoirs (1894).

He also edited the Clarke Papers (1891–1901), and Mrs Hutchinson's Memoirs of Colonel Hutchinson (1885), and wrote an introduction to the Stuart Tracts, 1603–1693 (1903), besides contributions to the Dictionary of National Biography. In 1909 he published The Last Years of the Protectorate.

Godfrey Davies, who had been Firth's student and then his research assistant at Oxford between 1910 and 1925, edited and published Firth's posthumously published works.

See also
 Historiography of the United Kingdom
Oliver Cromwell
Duke of Newcastle
Edmund Ludlow
Colonel John Hutchinson
Robert Venables
Sir William Clarke

References

Further reading
 
Attribution

External links

 
 
 

1857 births
1936 deaths
19th-century English historians
20th-century English historians
People educated at Clifton College
Fellows of All Souls College, Oxford
Fellows of Pembroke College, Oxford
Alumni of Balliol College, Oxford
Presidents of the Royal Historical Society
People from Ecclesall
Knights Bachelor
Regius Professors of History (University of Oxford)
English legal writers
Fellows of the British Academy
Members of the American Antiquarian Society